The 1806 New Hampshire gubernatorial election was held on March 11, 1806.

Incumbent Democratic-Republican Governor John Langdon won re-election to a second term.

General election

Major candidates
John Langdon, Democratic-Republican, incumbent Governor

Minor candidates
The following candidates may not have been formally nominated and attracted only scattering votes.

Timothy Farrar, Chief Justice of the Court of Common Pleas for Hillsborough County, former justice of the New Hampshire Superior Court of Judicature
John Taylor Gilman, Federalist, former Governor
Oliver Peabody, Federalist, former President of the New Hampshire Senate
Jeremiah Smith, Federalist, Chief Justice of the New Hampshire Superior Court of Judicature

Results

Notes

References

1806
New Hampshire
Gubernatorial